Uljay Qutlugh Khatun (born 14 March 1297) (lit. "Queen Uljay Qutlugh), also Öljei Qutlugh, Oljai Kutlugh or Uljaki, was a Mongol princess, and empress consort of the Ilkhanate as the principal wife of Abu Sa'id Bahadur Khan.

Early life
Uljay Qutlugh Khatun was born on 14 March 1297 at Shehraban. She was the only daughter of Ghazan Khan. Her mother was Bulughan Khatun, the daughter of Otman, and granddaughter of Obetay Nuyun of the Qonqirut tribe. Bulughan married Ghazan in October 1295, after both of them converted to Islam. Uljay had a younger full brother named Alju, who died in infancy.

Marriages

Bistam
On 17 September 1303, Ghazan betrothed Uljay to Bistam, the eldest son of Ghazan's younger brother Öljaitü Khan. The marriage took place on 12 January 1305, when Uljay was seven. By marrying Ghazan's only surviving child to his eldest son, Öljaitu wished to consolidate his position as well as his successor, as heir to Ghazan's legacy.

Abu Sa'id
After Bistam's premature death, Uljay was betrothed to his younger brother Abu Saʿid, at the time of the prince's departure to Khurasan. The marriage took place before his accession to the throne on 5 July 1317, and Uljay became his chief and most beloved wife. 

Shushtar was allocated to the wages (mavajib) of Uljay Qutlugh.

Ancestry

References

Sources

1297 births
Year of death unknown
14th-century Mongolian women
Princesses
Mongol empresses
People of the Ilkhanate
Converts to Islam
14th-century Muslims